

Public and private universities and colleges in Tulsa, Oklahoma

Tulsa is home to a variety of colleges and universities, including:
National American University- Tulsa campus
Langston University - Tulsa campus
Oklahoma State University–Tulsa  (upper division undergraduate and graduate campus)
Oral Roberts University  (private)
Philips Theological Seminary (private)
Tulsa Community College
University of Oklahoma - Schusterman Center (upper division undergraduate and graduate campus)
University of Tulsa  (private)

References

Tulsa, Oklahoma
 List of colleges
Universities and colleges in Tulsa, Oklahoma